Rudolf Wojtowicz (born 9 June 1956 in Bytom) is a retired Polish football player, who in different periods of his career was a defender or a midfielder. Wojtowicz initially represented Szombierki Bytom, winning Polish championships in 1980. In the early 1980s he left Poland and settled in Germany. Wojtowicz played for Bayer Leverkusen (1982–1986) as well as Fortuna Düsseldorf (1986–1992). Also, between 1996 and 1998, he was head coach of Fortuna. Currently, he works as one of coaches of Hertha Berlin.

Wojtowicz capped once for Poland, on 12 April 1978, in a game vs. Ireland.

References

Living people
1956 births
Polish footballers
Poland international footballers
Bundesliga players
Bayer 04 Leverkusen players
Fortuna Düsseldorf players
Expatriate footballers in Germany
Sportspeople from Bytom
Polish expatriate footballers
Polish football managers
Fortuna Düsseldorf managers
Szombierki Bytom players
German footballers needing infoboxes
Association football defenders
Association football midfielders